Empress Xiaocigao may refer to:

 Empress Xiaocigao (Ming Dynasty), empress of the Hongwu Emperor of the Ming Dynasty, also known as Empress Ma
 Empress Xiaocigao (Qing Dynasty), concubine of Nurhaci, founder of the Qing Dynasty, also known as Lady Yehenara Monggo